is one of the many painted kofun or burial mounds in northern Kyushu, Japan. Located in Chikushino City in Fukuoka Prefecture, the circular burial mound, with a diameter of thirty-metres, was discovered in 1947. Two years later it was designated an Historic Site. The  exhibits replicas of the paintings and has an observation room with a view into the mound. Most of the paintings, in red, green, and black, are to be found on the rear wall of the burial chamber within the tomb and include concentric circles, human figures, boats, birds, horses, and a building. Many objects were discovered during excavations, including swords, iron arrowheads, horse fittings, jewelry, haji ware and Sue ware. The tomb is dated to c. 550-600.

See also
 Kofun
 Takamatsuzuka tumulus
 Monuments of Japan

References

Kofun
Museums in Fukuoka Prefecture
History museums in Japan